500 Miles High is a live album by Brazilian jazz singer Flora Purim that was recorded at the Montreux Jazz Festival. It was released in 1974 on Milestone Records.

Release and reception
AllMusic awarded the album with 4.5 stars and its review by Jim Newsom states: "the Brazilian songstress delivers a fiery performance that must have been a joy to behold".

Track listing

Personnel 
 Flora Purim – vocals, percussion
 David Amaro – electric and acoustic guitars
 Pat Rebillot – electric piano, organ
 Wagner Tiso – electric piano, organ
 Ron Carter – bass
 Robertinho Silva – drums, percussion, berimbau
 Airto Moreira – drums, percussion, berimbau, vocals (percussion solos on tracks 4, 5 and 7)
 Milton Nascimento – vocal, acoustic guitar (track 4)

References 

1974 albums
Flora Purim albums
Milestone Records albums
Albums produced by Orrin Keepnews
Albums recorded at the Montreux Jazz Festival